In the Aftermath (also known as In the Aftermath: Angels Never Sleep) is a 1988 independent film directed by Carl Colpaert, and released by New World International. The film is notable for being loosely based on, as well as using footage of, Mamoru Oshii's 1985 OVA, Angel's Egg.

Plot 
An angel nursing a large egg is sent to an irradiated earth, with orders to see if mankind can be saved. On earth, two surviving soldiers, Frank and Goose, scavenge for supplies, oxygen, and water. The two become injured during a confrontation with a scavenger, and Goose is shot and killed. As Frank struggles to survive, the angel appears to him in a vision, as she grapples with the consequences of using her power to rescue a human race that may not deserve to be saved.

Production 
In the Aftermath was shot on a low budget, and used live-action segments in order to pair it with footage from Angel's Egg, which the studio acquired in a distribution bundle, and ended up paying very little for the rights to. Neither director Colpaert nor producer Tom Dugan understood the original film, calling it "incomprehensible," and opted to shoot live-action segments in order for it to make more sense to audiences.

The crew and actors working on the live-action segments had no idea how their footage would be cut with, and were given very little direction.

The live-action portions of the film were shot in Fontana, California.

Release 
Despite the film being made to play off of the success of VHS and video rentals, the film was only ever released on video in the United Kingdom in 1988. In the Aftermath also had a limited theatrical run in Australia in 1988.

In 2019, In the Aftermath was released on Blu-ray with a new 2K scan by Arrow Video.

References 

1980s science fiction films
1988 independent films
Alternative versions of films
American films with live action and animation
American post-apocalyptic films
New World Pictures films